An Indrail Pass was a special railway pass available to foreign nationals created along the lines of the Eurail Pass for unlimited travel without reservation of a ticket on the Indian Railways network. This ticket was available for a special time period from half a day to 90 days.

Vide Railway Board order, Indrail passes have been discontinued.

References

External links 
 indrail passes
 Guardian Tips on Indian Train Travel

Tourism in India
Indian Railways
Rail passes